Tinea antricola is a cave-dwelling moth of the  family Tineidae. It is known from India, Sumatra, Indonesia and Malaysia.

The wingspan is 8–11 mm. The forewings are pale grey. The hindwings are light brassy-grey.

References

Tineinae
Moths described in 1924